Plaza de Isabel II may be:

 Plaza de Isabel II in Madrid
 Plaza de Isabel II (Santa Cruz de Tenerife)
 Plaza de Isabel II (Albacete)